The Landsmannschaft Ostpreußen ("Homeland Association of East Prussia") is a non-profit organization for Germans who were evacuated or expelled from East Prussia during World War II and its aftermath. It was formed on 3 October 1948 by East Prussian refugees in West Germany.

Organisation 
The Landsmannschaft represents people who were expelled or evacuated during World War II or after, as well as people who emigrated in more recent times, exercising their right to German citizenship, based on a 1913 German law.

The organization's current president is Stephan Grigat. Its seat is in Hamburg, and it is a member of the Bund der Vertriebenen. Its official newspaper is the Preußische Allgemeine Zeitung. The Bund Junges Ostpreußen is a subsidiary youth organization of the Landsmannschaft Ostpreußen; its predecessor, Junge Landsmannschaft Ostdeutschland, was disassociated from the parent organization in 2000.

Presidency 
 1948-1951: Ottomar Schreiber
 1952-1966: Alfred Gille
 1966-1971: Reinhold Rehs
 1971-1974: Joachim Freiherr von Braun
 1974-1979: Hans-Georg Bock
 1979-1990: Ottfried Hennig 
 1990-1992: Harry Poley
 1992-2010: Wilhelm von Gottberg
 since 6 November 2010: Stephan Grigat

See also 
 Evacuation of East Prussia

External links 
Landsmannschaft Ostpreußen 
Bund Junges Ostpreußen 
Preußische Allgemeine Zeitung 

1948 establishments in Germany
Landsmannschaften
East Prussia
Organizations established in 1948